Kevin Wilson (born 15 December 1927) was an Australian sailor. He competed in the Star event at the 1952 Summer Olympics.

References

External links
 

1927 births
Living people
Australian male sailors (sport)
Olympic sailors of Australia
Sailors at the 1952 Summer Olympics – Star
20th-century Australian people